Cingulata, part of the superorder Xenarthra, is an order of armored New World placental mammals. Dasypodids and chlamyphorids, the armadillos, are the only surviving families in the order. Two groups of cingulates much larger than extant armadillos (maximum body mass of 45 kg (100 lb) in the case of the giant armadillo) existed until recently: pampatheriids, which reached weights of up to 200 kg (440 lb) and chlamyphorid glyptodonts, which attained masses of 2,000 kg (4,400 lb) or more.

The cingulate order originated in South America during the Paleocene epoch about 66 to 56 million years ago, and due to the continent's former isolation remained confined to it during most of the Cenozoic. However, the formation of a land bridge allowed members of all three families to migrate to southern North America during the Pliocene or early Pleistocene as part of the Great American Interchange. After surviving for tens of millions of years, all of the pampatheriids and giant glyptodonts apparently died out during the Quaternary extinction event at the beginning of the Holocene, along with much of the rest of the regional megafauna, shortly after the colonization of the Americas by Paleo-Indians.

Description
Armadillos have dorsal armor that is formed by osteoderms, plates of dermal bone covered in relatively small, overlapping keratinized epidermal scales called "scutes". Most species have rigid shields over the shoulders and hips, with three to nine bands separated by flexible skin covering the back and flanks.

Pampatheres also had shells that were flexible due to three movable lateral bands of osteoderms. The osteoderms of pampatheres were each covered by a single scute, unlike those of armadillos, which have more than one. Glyptodonts, on the other hand, had rigid, turtle-like shells of fused osteoderms.

Both groups have or had a cap of armor atop their heads. Glyptodonts also had heavily armored tails; some, such as Doedicurus, had mace-like clubs at the ends of their tails, similar to those of ankylosaurs, evidently used for defensive or agonistic purposes.

Most armadillos eat insects and other invertebrates; some are more omnivorous and may also eat small vertebrates and vegetable matter. Pampatheres are thought to have been specialized for grazing, and isotopic analysis indicates the diet of glyptodonts was dominated by C4 grasses. Euphractinae is unique for speciations towards carnivory, culminating in the macropredatory genus Macroeuphractus.

Classification

The taxonomic table below follows the results of a phylogenetic analysis published by Delsuc et al., 2016. While glyptodonts have traditionally been considered stem-group cingulates outside the group that contains modern armadillos, this 2016 study conducted an analysis of Doedicurus mtDNA and found that it was, in fact, nested within the modern armadillos as the sister group of a clade consisting of Chlamyphorinae and Tolypeutinae.

Order Cingulata
 Family †Protobradyidae Ameghino 1902
 Genus †Protobradys Ameghino 1902
 Family †Peltephilidae Ameghino 1894
 Genus †Anantiosodon Ameghino 1891
 Genus †Epipeltephilus Ameghino 1904
 Genus †Parapeltecoelus Bordas 1938
 Genus †Peltecoelus Ameghino 1902
 Genus †Peltephilus Ameghino 1887 (Horned armadillo)
 Genus †Ronwolffia Shockey 2017
 Family †Paleopeltidae Ameghino 1895
 Genus †Palaeopeltis Ameghino 1895
 Family †Pampatheriidae 
 Genus ?†Machlydotherium Ameghino 1902
 Genus †Holmesina Simpson 1930
 Genus †Kraglievichia Castellanos 1927
 Genus †Machlydotherium 
 Genus †Pampatherium Ameghino 1875 ex Gervais & Ameghino 1880
 Genus †Scirrotherium Edmund & Theodor 1997
 Genus †Tonnicinctus  Góis et al. 2015
 Genus †Vassallia Castellanos 1927 [Plaina Castellanos 1937]
 Genus †Yuruatherium Ciancio et al. 2012
 Family †Pachyarmatheriidae Fernicola et al. 2018
 Genus †Neoglyptatelus Carlini, Vizcaíno & Scillato-Yané 1997
 Genus †Pachyarmatherium Downing & White 1995
 Family Dasypodidae (long-nosed armadillos)
 Genus †Acantharodeia
 Genus †Amblytatus
 Genus †Archaeutatus
 Genus †Astegotherium
 Genus †Astegotherium
 Genus †Barrancatatus
 Genus †Chasicotatus
 Genus †Chorobates
 Genus †Coelutaetus
 Genus †Eocoleophorus
 Genus †Epipeltecoelus
 Genus †Eutatus
 Genus †Hemiutaetus
 Genus †Isutaetus
 Genus †Lumbreratherium
 Genus †Macrochorobates
 Genus †Mazzoniphractus
 Genus †Meteutatus
 Genus †Pedrolypeutes
 Genus †Prodasypus
 Genus †Proeutatus
 Genus †Prostegotherium
 Genus †Pucatherium
 Genus †Punatherium
 Genus †Stegotherium
 Genus †Stenotatus
 Genus †Utaetus
 Genus †Vetelia
 Subfamily Dasypodinae
 Genus †Anadasypus
 Genus Dasypus 
 Genus †Nanoastegotherium
 Genus †Parastegosimpsonia
 Genus †Pliodasypus
 Genus †Propraopus
 Genus †Riostegotherium
 Genus †Stegosimpsonia
 Family Chlamyphoridae: glyptodonts and other armadillos
 Subfamily Chlamyphorinae: fairy armadillos
 Genus Calyptophractus
 Genus Chlamyphorus
 Subfamily Euphractinae: hairy, six-banded and pichi armadillos
 Genus Chaetophractus
 Genus †Doellotatus
 Genus Euphractus
 Genus †Macroeuphractus
Genus  †Peltephilus
 Genus †Proeuphractus
 Genus †Paleuphractus
 Genus Zaedyus
 Subfamily  †Glyptodontinae: glyptodonts
 Genus †Doedicurus
 Genus †Glyptodon
 Genus †Glyptotherium
 Genus †Hoplophorus
 Genus †Panochthus
 Genus †Parapropalaehoplophorus
 Genus †Plaxhaplous
 Subfamily Tolypeutinae: giant, three-banded and naked-tailed armadillos
 Genus Cabassous
 Genus †Kuntinaru
 Genus Priodontes
 Genus Tolypeutes

References

 
Xenarthrans
Mammal orders
Taxa named by Johann Karl Wilhelm Illiger
Extant Thanetian first appearances